The 100-yard dash is a track and field sprint event of . It was part of the Commonwealth Games until 1970, and was included in the triathlon of the Olympics in 1904. It is not generally used in international events, replaced by the 100-metre sprint (109.36 yards). However, it is still occasionally run in the United States in certain competitions; it was last run at the NCAA championships in 1975. Walter Halben Butler (1852–1931) is credited with being the first to run the race in 10 seconds.

All-time top 25
Automatic timed results only.
+ = en route to 100 m performance
A = affected by altitude
nw = no wind measurement

Men
Correct as of February 2017.

Notes
Below is a list of other times equal or superior to 9.37:

Asafa Powell also ran 9.09+ (2010), 9.26+ (2015), 9.27+ (2013).
Charles Greene also ran 9.23 A (1967).
Usain Bolt ran 9.23+ (2016), 9.29+ (2012).
Kim Collins also ran 9.30+ (2013), 9.34+ (2014).
Mike Rodgers also ran 9.37+ (2013).

Women

Note: The following athletes have had their performances annulled due to doping offense:

Notes
Below is a list of other times equal or superior to 10.33:

Veronica Campbell-Brown also ran 10.22+ (2011).
Heike Drechsler also ran 10.24i (1986).
Schillonie Calvert also ran 10.30+ (2011).
Debbie Ferguson also ran 10.31+ (2011)
Marita Koch also ran 10.33i (1979, 1981).

Notable 100-yard dash runners

Men

Women

References

External links
All-time men's best 100 yards www.alltime-athletics.com

 Newspaper articles Tribune Cap 6 October 1930 (Des Moines, Iowa ?) and Los Angeles Times Jan 1974 cited on Frank Wykoff tribute website

Events in track and field
Sprint (running)